Mehrab Shahrokhi (February 2, 1944 – February 1, 1993) was an Iranian footballer.
He was an Afro-Iranian from Khuzestan Province. He was nicknamed The Black Bomber because of his style of play and dark skin and his strong kicks.

Club career
Shahrokhi began his football career in his birthplace, Ahvaz, playing for Shenaye Ahvaz Club. In 1963 he moved to Tehran and began playing for Shahin F.C. Shahrokhi left for Daraei F.C. in 1966, after problems with Shahin's management. His spell at Darei was short-lived, moving first to Paykan F.C. and then to Persepolis F.C. There he could win the Iranian championship in 1972 and 1974.

He continued playing with Persepolis until 1974 and retired from football in 1975.

International career
While still in Ahvaz, in 1963 Shahrokhi was invited to join the Iranian national football team. He was to participate in the football tournament of the 1964 Summer Olympics, but he missed out after boycotting the team along with a number of other Shahin players. They refused to accompany the national team because the national team director — a fan of Shahin's rival, Daraei F.C. — had decided to drop several Shahin players from the squad in favor of Daraei players. A number of players including Shahrokhi were banned from any involvement in football for one year.

In 1968, he won with the national team its first major title, the Asian Cup in Iran.

Retirement
In 1976 came Shahrokhi's debut in Iranian cinema, acting in a movie called Alafhaye Harz. Acting was not his passion though, and he became the manager of several teams after retirement, but was not able to achieve anything impressive, as the Iranian Revolution and Iran–Iraq War caused football's presence to diminish in 1980s Iran.

Death
Shahrokhi died on February 1, 1993.

References
 

Iranian footballers
Iran international footballers
Association football defenders
Shahin FC players
Persepolis F.C. players
Paykan F.C. players
1943 births
1993 deaths
Persepolis F.C. managers
Asian Games silver medalists for Iran
Asian Games medalists in football
Footballers at the 1966 Asian Games
Medalists at the 1966 Asian Games
1968 AFC Asian Cup players
Iranian football managers
Iranian people of African descent
Sportspeople from Khuzestan province